The Park Hill Fire was a fire during the 2015 California Wildfire season. It started on June 20, 2015 in San Luis Obispo County by a chunk of coal that flew out of the exhaust pipe of a vehicle. The fire burned 1,791 acres, destroyed 23 buildings, and 4 people were injured by or during the fire. CalFire had 15 personnel and 3 engines working on the fire. The fire was contained on June 24, 2015.

References 

2015 California wildfires